Mulund is a railway station on the Central Line of the Mumbai Suburban Railway network.
 
Mulund railway station is connected via the Central Railway to South Bombay and remote places like Khopoli and Kasara.

History
Mulund station was built to serve the suburb of Mulund, which was laid out in the 1920s. In the 1970s a new goods terminal was constructed at Mulund to handle increased volumes of freight. On 13 March 2003 a bomb exploded on a train pulling into Mulund station at 21:45 hrs. 10 people were killed and 70 injured.

Layout
Mulund is a stop for slow local trains as well as most fast local trains on the Central line of the Mumbai suburban network. The station is equipped to accommodate 12-car as well as 15-car (Platform no. 3 & 4) local trains. During the peak hour, there is a fast train halting every few minutes.

Up direction escalators being built and running on platform number 1 & between platform 2 & platform 3. 

Mulund has four platforms, platform numbers 1 and 2 are reserved for slow trains and platform numbers 3 and 4 for fast trains. Platforms 1 and 3 are for trains travelling towards Thane and beyond, whereas platforms 2 and 4 are for trains travelling towards Dadar, Chhatrapati Shivaji Maharaj Terminus.

References

Railway stations opened in 1915
Railway stations in Mumbai Suburban district
Mumbai Suburban Railway stations
Mumbai CR railway division